John Friberg Kramer (17 November 1934 – 13 July 1994) was a Danish footballer who played as a midfielder. He made four appearances for the Denmark national team in 1959.

References

External links
 

1934 births
1994 deaths
Danish men's footballers
Association football midfielders
Denmark international footballers
Køge Boldklub players
Nykøbing FC players
People from Ringsted
Sportspeople from Region Zealand